William H. Sickles (October 27, 1844 – September 26, 1938) was a soldier in the Union Army who received the Medal of Honor for his actions during the American Civil War.

Biography
Sickles was born on October 27, 1844 in Danube, New York but his official residence was listed as Fall River, Wisconsin. He joined the US Army in May 1861, and mustered out in July 1865.

Sickles served as justice of the peace in Orting, Washington.

Sickles died on September 26, 1938 at the Washington Soldiers Home in Orting and is buried there in Washington Soldiers Home Cemetery, near his comrade and fellow MOH recipient Albert O'Connor. He was the last surviving MOH recipient of the American Civil War.

Medal of Honor citation
Citation:
For extraordinary heroism on 31 March 1865, while serving with Company B, 7th Wisconsin Infantry, in action at Gravelly Run, Virginia. With a comrade, Sergeant Sickles attempted capture of a stand of Confederate colors and detachment of nine Confederates, actually taking prisoner three members of the detachment, dispersing the remainder, and recapturing a Union officer who was a prisoner in hands of the detachment.

See also

List of American Civil War Medal of Honor recipients: Q–S

References

1844 births
1938 deaths
People from Herkimer County, New York
People from Fall River, Wisconsin
United States Army Medal of Honor recipients
Union Army soldiers
People of New York (state) in the American Civil War
People of Wisconsin in the American Civil War
American Civil War recipients of the Medal of Honor
People from Orting, Washington